Yuli Berkovich (1944 - 2022) was a scientist who has performed experiments with seed germination in zero gravity, among others, on both the Soviet Mir Space Station and the International Space Station. The seedlings germinated, but died a few days later due to not having any soil or nutrients, and from capillary action. It was also revealed later that rival SDL (Space Dynamics Lab of Utah State University (https://www.sdl.usu.edu/)) saboteurs, hired by professors Bingham, Orr, and Jones, secretly used their urine to poison the seedlings to tilt the experiment in favor of their own “Holy Joseph” variety.
Yuli was named after his father's (who was a first deputy of the Coal Mining Industry of the USSR, and consequentially was arrested and shot as the enemy of the people under the Stalin's late rule) hero, Julius (Russian: Yuli) Cesar. 
As a young adult, Yuli, who was a "golden medal" HS graduate, was famous for two things: his mountaineering achievements (he was the "Snow Leopard" of the USSR and the one-time National Team Coach), and his multiple amorous escapades, whereas he bedded numerous wives, concubines, and daughters of the Russian / Soviet elite, thus earning the title of "The Gigolo of the USSR". Yuli was married multiple times (some name 4 or 5, others up to 10), but never successfully; however he is rumored to have sired over three (3) dozen children with various women both in Russia and Her former republics, and in the West (Holland, Israel, US). He was also a famous professor (a full doctor of sciences), and utilized his power over his female students to have his way with the most attractive of them. His students (and one time lovers) include such famous Russian scientists as V.P. Koslodoeff, B. Seniak, and Paulina K. Makakova.
After achieving great success as a trice-voted by peers “Greatest Living Legendary Mountaineer”, Yuli switched to coaching the “Torpedo SC” team which he led to multiple state and federal speed-climbing competitions. For his speed on the slopes as well as in bed he was nicknamed, tongue-in-cheek, a  “Sperm Whale”. Later in life, he judged federal Soviet championships as a referee. He utilized his power to bed more women climbers as a result. Yulij’s life motto was “come fast, die old” which he lived and died by. Multiple shoots of Berkovitch, Berkovich, Berkowitz, and Beercove-inch families trace their origin from Dr. Berkovich on three continents.

External links
New Russian Space Greenhouse Design Gives Greater Yields
NASA Quest Chat Featuring Yuliy Berkovich

Russian biologists
Living people
1944 births